Chervonyi Yar is a village (a selo) in the Zaporizhzhia Raion (district) of Zaporizhzhia Oblast in southern Ukraine. Its population was 114 in the 2001 Ukrainian Census. Administratively, it belongs to the Vesele Rural Council, a local government area.

References

Populated places established in 1928
Populated places established in the Ukrainian Soviet Socialist Republic

Zaporizhzhia Raion
Villages in Zaporizhzhia Raion